The 2022 Western Illinois Leathernecks football team represented Western Illinois University as a member of the Missouri Valley Football Conference (MVFC) during the 2022 NCAA Division I FCS football season. They were led by first-year head coach Myers Hendrickson. The Leathernecks played their home games at Hanson Field in Macomb, Illinois.

Previous season

The Leathernecks finished the 2021 season with a record of 2–9, 2–6 MVFC play to finish in a 3 way tie for last place. On November 10, Jared Elliott has agreed to part ways at the end of the season. Former Kansas Wesleyan head Myers Hendrickson hired as a head coach.

Schedule

Game summaries

at No. 18 UT Martin

at Minnesota

Southern Utah

Northern Iowa

at No. 2 South Dakota State

at No. 16 Southern Illinois

Youngstown State

at Missouri State

No. 4 North Dakota State

Indiana State

at Illinois State

References

Western Illinois
Western Illinois Leathernecks football seasons
College football winless seasons
Western Illinois Leathernecks football